Bishop Moses Bosco Anderson, SSE (September 9, 1928 – January 1, 2013) was a bishop in the Catholic Church.

Biography
He was born on September 9, 1928 in Selma, Alabama, and graduated from Knox Academy there in the year 1949. He was a member of the Society of St. Edmund. Anderson then attended Saint Michael's College in Winooski, Vermont, where he majored in philosophy attaining a B.A. and graduating magna cum laude. From there he moved on to Saint Edmund's Seminary in Burlington, Vermont.

He earned an M.S. in Sociology at St. Michael's College in 1961. He also earned an M.A. in Theology at Xavier University in 1968.

Anderson was ordained priest on May 30, 1958.  He was appointed auxiliary bishop of the Archdiocese of Detroit on December 3, 1982, and consecrated at the Cathedral of the Most Blessed Sacrament on January 27, 1983. Since December 2, 1982 he was named the titular bishop of Vatarba. On January 18, 1992, he became the head of Precious Blood Parish in Detroit.

Beginning January 10, 1994, Bishop Anderson headed Region 1 of the archdiocese which includes Detroit, Highland Park, Hamtramck, Grosse Pointe and Harper Woods making ten vicariates. He retired in the year 2003 upon reaching the age of 75.

Death
He had died on January 1, 2013, in Livonia, Michigan, from cardiac arrest.

References

External links
Catholic-Hierarchy
Saint Edmund's Seminary, Burlington, Vermont

1928 births
2013 deaths
People from Selma, Alabama
20th-century American Roman Catholic titular bishops
African-American Roman Catholic bishops
Roman Catholic Archdiocese of Detroit
Religious leaders from Alabama
Religious leaders from Michigan
Catholics from Alabama
20th-century African-American people
21st-century African-American people
African-American Catholic consecrated religious